Alvin Hovy Moore (November 19, 1891 – November 9, 1972) was an American horse rider who competed in the 1932 Summer Olympics. In 1932 he and his horse Water Pat won the bronze medal as member of the American dressage team in the team dressage competition after finishing seventh in the individual dressage event.

Moore served in the United States Army during both World War I and II, earning a Bronze Star Medal. He retired from active duty as a colonel and was buried at Fort Bliss National Cemetery after his death.

References

External links
Profile at Database und er ist ein böser Skypekontakt Olympics

1891 births
1972 deaths
United States Army personnel of World War I
American male equestrians
American dressage riders
Equestrians at the 1932 Summer Olympics
Olympic bronze medalists for the United States in equestrian
Medalists at the 1932 Summer Olympics
United States Army personnel of World War II
United States Army colonels